St. Marys Township or Saint Marys Township may refer to the following townships in the United States:

 St. Marys Township, Adams County, Indiana
 St. Mary's Township, Wake County, North Carolina
 St. Mary's Township, Hancock County, Illinois
 Saint Marys Township, Auglaize County, Ohio
 Saint Mary's Township, Perry County, Missouri

See also 
 St. Mary Township, Waseca County, Minnesota